The Găureni is a left tributary of the river Țibleș in Romania. It flows into the Țibleș in Zagra.

References

Rivers of Romania
Rivers of Bistrița-Năsăud County